Ana Hatherly (8 May 1929 – 5 August 2015) was a Portuguese academic, poet, visual artist, essayist, film maker, painter and writer. She was considered one of the pioneers of the experimental poetry and experimental literature movement in Portugal.

Biography 
Hatherly was born in Porto, Portugal, in 1929. She obtained a degree in Germanic philology from the University of Lisbon and a doctorate in Hispanic studies from the University of California, Berkeley, Berkeley, and was also trained in both film and music. Hatherly was a professor of human and social sciences at Universidade Nova de Lisboa, where she founded the university's Institute of Portuguese Studies. She utilized film, visual arts, and poetry in her work, which included the avant-garde.

During 1958, she started her literary career with the publication of Um Ritmo Perdido, a collection of poems. Her poetry books include Um Calculador de Improbabilidades (2001), O Pavão Negro (2003), Itinerários (2003) and Fibrilações (2005). Hatherly has published poetry, essays and fiction that has been translated into European languages, Japanese and Chinese. She later became Emeritus Professor and a founding member of the Universidade Nova de Lisboa. She was also the Chair of the Portuguese PEN Club.

Hatherly was interested in the visual aspects of poetry, which led to her successfully exploring visual mediums of art, such as painting and films. 

Ana Hatherly died in a hospital in Lisbon, on 5 August 2015, at the age of 86. Her funeral was held at the Estrela Basilica in Lisbon, with burial in the Olivais cemetery.

Poetry
Um Ritmo Perdido (1958)
As Aparências (1959)
A Dama e o Cavaleiro (1960)
Sigma (1965)
Estruturas Poéticas - Operação 2 (1967)
Eros Frenético (1968)
39 Tisanas (1969)
Anagramático (1970)
63 Tisanas: (40-102) (1973)
Poesia: 1958-1978 (1980)
Ana Viva e Plurilida (1982)
O Cisne Intacto (1983)
A Cidade das Palavras (1988)
Volúpsia (1994)
351 Tisanas (1997)
Rilkeana (1999)
Um Calculador de Improbabilidades (2001)
O Pavão Negro (2003)
Itinerários (2003)
Fibrilações (2005)
A Idade da Escrita e outros poemas (2005)
463 Tisanas (2006)
A Neo-Penélope (2007)

Museum Collections 

 Calouste Gulbenkian Museum, Lisbon, Portugal
Círculo de Artes Plásticas de Coimbra, Coimbra, Portugal
 Morris and Helen Belkin Art Gallery, Vancouver, British Columbia
Museu Coleção Berardo, Lisbon, Portugal
Serralves Museum of Contemporary Art, Porto, Portugal
The Museum of Art, Architecture and Technology, Lisbon, Portugal
National Museum of Women in the Arts

References

Further reading 

 Zink, Rui. "The Man Who Shot Ana Hatherly." Theory in Action 13, no. 4 (10, 2020): 27-38. doi: http://dx.doi.org/10.3798/tia.1937-0237.2048.

External links 

 Calouste Gulbenkian Museum. “Ana Hatherly and the Baroque. In a Garden Made of Ink” Last modified October 25, 2017. https://gulbenkian.pt/museu/en/ana-hatherly-and-the-baroque-in-garden-made-of-ink/
 Elmcip. “Person: Ana Hatherly”, https://elmcip.net/person/ana-hatherly
 Luís Alves de Matos. “Ana Hatherly – The Intelligent Hand – Trailer” Vimeo, March 18, 2011. https://vimeo.com/21200605
 Natalie Ferris. “The Intelligent Hand: Ana Hatherly, Asemic Writing, Visualizing the Creative Act” Modernism/Modernity, https://modernismmodernity.org/forums/posts/ferris-intelligent-hand-ana-hatherly
 PoemsfromthePortuguese. “Ana Hatherly”. http://www.poemsfromtheportuguese.org/Ana_Hatherly

1929 births
2015 deaths
20th-century Portuguese poets
Academic staff of NOVA University Lisbon
University of California, Berkeley alumni
University of Lisbon alumni
People from Porto
Portuguese women poets
21st-century Portuguese poets
20th-century Portuguese women writers
21st-century Portuguese women writers